Vocal communication may refer to:
Speech, a form of human communication
Animal communication using vocalizations